The 2014–15 Alcorn State Braves basketball team represented Alcorn State University during the 2014–15 NCAA Division I men's basketball season. The Braves, led by fourth head coach Luther Riley, played their home games at the Davey Whitney Complex and were members of the Southwestern Athletic Conference. They finished the season 6–26, 4–14 in SWAC play to finish in ninth place. They advanced to the quarterfinals of the SWAC tournament where they lost to Texas Southern.

On January 6, head coach Luther Riley took a personal leave of absence. Assistant coach Shawn Pepp led the Braves in Riley's absence. On March 23, it was announced that Riley's expiring contract would not be renewed.

Roster

Schedule

|-
!colspan=9 style="background:#A020F0; color:#FFD700;"| Regular season

|-
!colspan=9 style="background:#A020F0; color:#FFD700;"| SWAC tournament

References

Alcorn State Braves basketball seasons
Alcorn State